The Northeastern Huskies represented Northeastern University in the Women's Hockey East Association during the 2015–16 NCAA Division I women's ice hockey season.  The squad was captained by Patty Kazmaier Award winner Kendall Coyne.

Recruiting

Roster

2015–16 Huskies

Schedule

|-
!colspan=12 style=""| Regular Season

|-
!colspan=12 style=""| WHEA Tournament

|-
!colspan=12 style=""| NCAA Tournament

Awards and honors
 Kendall Coyne named to NCAA 2016 Top 10 Athletes (all sports).
 Kendall Coyne named 2016 Best Female Athlete in 'Globies' award from the Boston Globe
Kendall Coyne named Patty Kazmaier Award winner as best NCAA women's hockey player in the nation for 2015–16.
Kendall Coyne wins Cammi Granato Award as top player in the WHEA.
Records set by Kendall Coyne:  Northeasterns all-time leading goal-scorer (141) and point scorer (249); WHEA season record for goals (50) and points (55).
Kendall Coyne (USA), Denisa Křížová (Czech Rep.) and Lucie Povova(Czech Rep.), named to World Championship national teams

WHEA All-Star Team Honors

Kendall Coyne, F - First Team
Brittany Bugalski, G - Second Team & Rookie Team
Jordan Krause, D - Second Team
Denisa Křížová, F - Second Team
Heather Mottau, D - Honorable Mention
Maddie Hartman, D - Rookie Team

References

Northeastern
Northeastern Huskies women's ice hockey seasons